Hockings is a surname. Notable people with the surname include:

 Albert John Hockings (1826–1890), mayor of Brisbane, Queensland, Australia
 Lucy Hockings (born 1975), New Zealand television journalist

See also
 Hocking (disambiguation)